Pambashe is a constituency of the National Assembly of Zambia. It covers a rural area in Kawambwa District of Luapula Province, including the towns of Chibote, Katota and Mushota.

List of MPs

References

Constituencies of the National Assembly of Zambia
1991 establishments in Zambia
Constituencies established in 1991